Samuel Pritchard Matheson (September 20, 1852May 19, 1942) was a Canadian clergyman, Archbishop of Rupert's Land, and fourth, as well as the longest-serving, Primate of the Anglican Church of Canada.

Life
Born in the parish of Kildonan, Manitoba, the son of John and Catherine (Pritchard) Matheson, Matheson received a Bachelor of Divinity in 1879 from
St. John's College, University of Manitoba, and a Doctor of Divinity degree in 1903. He was ordained a deacon in 1875 and a priest in 1876. He was Master of St. John's College and Professor of Exegetical Theology.

In 1882, he was made a Canon of St. John's Cathedral in Winnipeg and Dean of Rupert's Land in 1902. In 1905 he became Archbishop of Rupert's Land and in 1909 was elected Primate of the Anglican Church of Canada, serving until 1931. He resigned the Canadian primacy in September 1930 and his diocesan See on January 31, 1931.

From 1908 to 1934, he was the 2nd Chancellor of the University of Manitoba. He founded Havergal Ladies' College in Winnipeg and was its president.

References

 Primates of the Anglican Church of Canada
 Metropolitans of the Ecclesiastical Province of Rupert's Land
 The story of Manitoba (Volume 2)
 Manitoba Historical Society biography
 The election of a primate: a primer

1852 births
1942 deaths
Canadian university and college chancellors
Primates of the Anglican Church of Canada
University of Manitoba alumni
Academic staff of the University of Manitoba
Anglican bishops of Rupert's Land
Metropolitans of Rupert's Land